Wallace Treadaway (15 May 1918 – 18 August 2003) was a South African cricketer. He played in nine first-class matches for Border from 1947/48 to 1949/50.

See also
 List of Border representative cricketers

References

External links
 

1918 births
2003 deaths
South African cricketers
Border cricketers
Cricketers from Cape Town